Slade Willis (born May 1, 1950) is a retired Canadian football player who played for the BC Lions, Hamilton Tiger-Cats, Winnipeg Blue Bombers and Toronto Argonauts. He played college football at Drake University.

References

1950 births
Living people
BC Lions players
Drake Bulldogs football players